Kirby: Right Back at Ya!, known in Japan as , is a Japanese anime series based on Nintendo's Kirby franchise. Produced by Chubu-Nippon Broadcasting, Dentsu, A-UN Entertainment and Studio Sign, it was directed by Sōji Yoshikawa and Mitsuo Kusakabe, with Yoshikawa handling series composition, Miyuki Shimabukuro designing the characters, Kazuo Iimura serving as chief animation director, and Akira Miyagawa composing the music. The series ran for one hundred episodes on CBC and TBS, from October 2001 to September 2003 in Japan. In the United States, the show aired on Fox Box, beginning in September 2002. Episodes have also been released on the Kirby TV Channel for the Wii game console (only in Europe), and on the game compilation Kirby's Dream Collection (also for the Wii).

The anime follows Kirby, a pink, spherical, childlike creature who does not speak coherent words but possesses the ability to take on new magical powers temporarily by sucking up their owners. Kirby crash-lands on a planet called Popstar and quickly befriends two yellow-skinned siblings named Tiff and Tuff. Over the course of the series, Kirby and his friends fight to bring down evil emperor Nightmare, all the while evading King Dedede and his assistant Escargoon, who try to get rid of Kirby using numerous monsters provided by NightMare Enterprises.

Plot

Tens of thousands of years ago, an evil emperor of darkness known as Nightmare created a biological weapon in the form of armies of monsters, and sent it all over the universe to conquer it. However, as he kept creating them, some of them began to rebel against Nightmare. Then, Sir Meta Knight and other freedom- and peace-loving, righteous Star Warriors formed the Galaxy Soldier Army in order to bring down Nightmare and stood to combat his evil. However, the soldier army caves in under the inexhaustible supply of the monsters. While the few surviving Star Warriors were relegated to the fringes of the universe, they were looking for new ways to defeat Nightmare. Meanwhile, Nightmare established a corporate empire, NightMare Enterprises, which systematically and efficiently created monsters and expanded its own power by selling them to large and small villains and money-hungry rich people throughout the universe.

Eventually, somewhere in the galaxy, the next generation of Star Warriors, Kirby, is born. Kirby was to gain strength against Nightmare as he slept in a spaceship he had acquired from parts unknown. However, the Star Warrior's spacecraft has the ability to automatically go to the planet where the monsters are located, and when the spacecraft catches the presence of Planet Popstar's monsters, it wakes Kirby up two hundred years ahead of schedule, and the inexperienced, clueless and baby-like Kirby, is unable to control the spacecraft as it crash-lands in Pupu Village (Cappy Town in the English dub). After crash-landing, Kirby makes friends with siblings Tiff and Tuff in the English dub and others in Cappy Town, and with their help, he was assigned to fight the monsters to overthrow Nightmare.

The ruler of Dream Land, King Dedede, is jealous and suspicious of Kirby from the start. He and his right-hand man Escargoon constantly try to get rid of Kirby with monsters provided by the company for a high fee, and ultimately, their plans always backfire when Kirby interferes. Just as in the games, Kirby can inhale enemies and temporarily gain their powers, transforming into forms such as Fire Kirby, and Sword Kirby.

Kirby grows and becomes stronger before his final battle with Nightmare. In the end when Kirby and Tiff face Nightmare, which is in a dream, Tiff throws the Warp Star at Kirby, who swallows it and becomes Star Rod Kirby. Star Rod Kirby has the Star Rod which is Nightmare's sole weakness, allowing Kirby to defeat him.

Characters

Kirby is a young Star Warrior. He is spoken of in legend as Kirby of the Stars, because a Star Warrior's ship is designed to go wherever monsters are. Kirby's ship detected the creatures Dedede was ordering and he was awakened 200 years before schedule. Due to this early awakening he is still only a child. He does not speak a word, mainly only saying "poyo." This is to avoid giving him a fixed impression, as Kirby is a game character whose image differs from one player to another. However, he can speak simple words, such as the names of people and food, in baby talk. In the original games (mainly in the instruction manual of the earlier games), he is merely established as "young", but in the anime, he is established as something close to a baby. He may shout the name of a special move in combat, but this is set up as his internal voice getting through to him, not him actually speaking. Most of his combat techniques in the show are copy abilities only. There are a total of 29 types of abilities: 24 from the games, 4 originals created by the audience (Baton, Water, Iron, and Top), and 1 original from the special episode (Kabuki).

Tiff is the daughter of the Cabinet Minister. She has lived in Dedede's castle her entire life due to the wealth of her parents. She's very intelligent for her age, with much of her interest being in the environment, with her favorite subject being marine biology. She can also be short-tempered and definitely speaks her mind on things, especially when she thinks King Dedede is up to no good, though sometimes her intelligence is scoffed by the fellow Cappies. Tiff is the only one who can summon Kirby's Warp Star when he is in danger, for Meta Knight said that Kirby cannot keep it safe himself, so she can control it because she truly cares for him.

Tuff is the younger brother of Tiff, who sports shaggy hair with hidden arcane eyes (oddly never mentioned by his friends). He is in many ways her complete opposite, preferring to play outside rather than read books. He can be quite a troublemaker, even when he's really trying to help, usually tending to fall short to Dedede's schemes. He is typically impetuous and always getting into mischief, such as pulling pranks and cracking jokes but is now friends with Kirby, even though he gets jealous of him sometimes.

King Dedede is the self-proclaimed ruler of Dream Land. Despite the fact Dedede is greedy, scheming, jealous of Kirby, and even outright sadistic, even going as far as to say that people's suffering amuses him, no one has ever tried to dethrone him, despite the fact that he also commonly threatens the children and environment. He's actually harmless for the most part, but his intense dislike of Kirby compels him to purchase monsters from Holy Nightmare Inc. and cause mayhem for the people of Dream Land. He loves buying new "toys" and acts like a spoiled child, despite his age. He is often jealous of the attention Kirby gets, and while at first he even wanted to defeat Kirby, later he focuses more on trying to kick him out or just make him look bad. He is portrayed as someone who is essentially good in the original games, merely childish and selfish, but in the anime he is portrayed as someone who can do some pretty bad deeds without hesitation. He is also depicted as a dictator who mostly abuses the absolute monarchy, but just like in the games, he comes off as gentle at heart. In addition, while the game version of Meta Knight has become more of an ally since the anime, King Dedede's personality has not changed in the games.

Escargoon, an anthropomorphic snail, lived with his mother on a farm before leaving to make it big. But despite the fact Escargoon is well-educated, knowing a great deal about chemistry and electronics (even writing a book on botany), he's been working for Dedede for many years as an assistant and punching bag. But it seems that he truly cares for the king and is always concerned for his welfare, despite the abuse he receives from him on a daily basis. While Escargoon usually goes along with what Dedede wants and helps him with his schemes, he may actually be a nice guy at heart who only acts mean because he wants Dedede's approval.

Meta Knight works for Dedede as well, along with his followers Sword Knight and Blade Knight. However, it is revealed that Meta Knight is a Star Warrior like Kirby, and one of the only ones to survive the war with Nightmare. He carries the sacred sword Galaxia, which only a select few can wield, and is the second strongest Star Warrior in the galaxy, after Kirby. He is portrayed as one of the coolest characters in the anime, which is dominated by characters with comical appearances. Though he has appeared as an enemy in all of the earlier game titles, in the anime, he is an ally of Kirby and his friends (until the third episode, he is portrayed as neither friend nor foe). The bat-like wings shown in the original games and the true face under his mask are not shown in the series. In most of the scenes in which he appears, he wraps his lower body in his own cloak, and he is rarely shown with his cloak hanging down as in the games, and does not show his lower body, hands, or sword unless it is necessary for combat or other purposes. Also, while his personality in the games is cool and single-minded, in addition to those traits in the anime, he is occasionally portrayed as mischievous, airheaded, mysterious, and narcissistic. As mentioned above, the character has become more of an ally since the anime.

As the public face of NightMare Enterprises, he handles much of the company's sales (and advertising) from the center of Nightmare's Fortress. In both the Japanese and English versions he can be quite sarcastic, and enjoys finding ways to make things difficult for King Dedede, although he is much more subtle about it in the original. In the English dub, he went through a drastic personality change; his persona is more that of the stereotypical "slimy used-car salesman", using a large amount of slang. In the original, his image is that of a polite Japanese salesperson, using a large amount of honorific language (even when he insults customers like Dedede). The English dub makes it seem like he wants nothing more but to defraud or swindle Dedede for every nickel he has, rather than actually helping him.

Nightmare (known as eNeMeE in the English dub) is the main antagonist of the series and the president of NightMare Enterprises. Nightmare only appears in the shadows for most of the series. His full form is only seen at the very end of the penultimate episode and in the series finale. Very little is known about him or his origins, but as his name suggests, he is a living nightmare. He thrives on suffering, creating monsters to sell in his company and use in his armies to continue his conquest of the universe in order to bring himself more power. He also gives off the illusion of being invincible, since he can open his cloak and suck all attacks into the area where his stomach and chest should be.

Episodes

Production

The original creator of the franchise Masahiro Sakurai was in charge of supervising the series, and the planning and production of the project began around 2000, coinciding with the development of Super Smash Bros. Melee. In an interview with Famitsu, Sakurai said, "I've had a lot of involvement in the production of the animation. We aim to create an anime that both parents and children can enjoy just as much as the games. In the beginning, Kirby started out as a game that even beginners could enjoy. I think that spirit has been carried over to the anime as well." He became friends with the cast and staff, and they held a birthday party for him when the day of voice recording for the final episodes happened to coincide with it.

Director Sōji Yoshikawa spoke at length about the challenges faced by the creators of the show. He expressed concern as most video game to anime adaptations do not go well, but as time went on, he says he began to see a character with strength, and felt it could be successful. He adds how difficult it was to have a main character who does not speak, as well as coming up with entirely unique settings and characters. Kirby is unusual in that it has no humans in the cast, and he likens it to the Finnish series Moomins, which was quite popular in Japan.

In the beginning, the background music was all original anime music composed by Akira Miyagawa, but from episode 34 onwards, BGM from previous games was also used. The songs that appeared most often came mainly from Kirby's Dream Land and Kirby Super Star, arranged to fit the anime's style. Furthermore, around the time of the release of Kirby Air Ride, the background music for it was heavily used as well. Kirby Air Ride also included some songs imported directly from the anime, with one of these songs, “Checker Knights” later being featured in Super Smash Bros. Brawl (with Miyagawa credited). Some of the arranged songs are included in the Kirby & the Amazing Mirror Sound+ music CD. After the anime ended, some of its character and copy ability-related traits were later used in the games.

The series occasionally makes use of 3DCG rendering for characters such as Kirby, King Dedede and Escargoon. Those segments were created in Softimage 3D and handled by A-UN Entertainment, with employees from Overlord Inc. also moving to A-UN to help with production. By applying the advanced synthesis technology that Nintendo and HAL Laboratory have created in the development of video game software to the production of the anime, they were able to eliminate the uncanny valley effect caused by combining hand-drawn and 3DCG animation. For some of the episodes that Studio Comet participated in the production of as animation production support, the Studio Comet CG department produced some of the 3DCG segments on its own. While many anime works use digital technology primarily to save money and shorten production time, this series makes the most of the new methods of expression afforded by digital tools. In the ending credits of the final episode, the names of most of the people involved in A-UN's 3DCG production up to that point appeared in the 3DCG-related staff section.

Before the main series aired on TV, a single short episode was produced as a pilot, and a DVD including it was distributed as a supplement in the game magazine Famitsu Cube+Advance (a now defunct sister magazine to Famitsu) to celebrate the release of Kirby Air Ride in Japan. It was made entirely in 3DCG, except for the backgrounds and some effects. Compared to the main series, the content of the pilot was much more closely aligned with the original action games, with boss characters from the games that did not appear in the main anime, and Meta Knight being an enemy. In addition, Kirby's design is from the Kirby's Adventure era, and the world itself has a different look as well. The pilot has no dialogue.

World and content
The world of the anime is very different from that of the games. In the games, the story takes place on the faraway planet Popstar (especially the entirety of the country of Dream Land/Pupupu Land, which is a part of Popstar) and its surrounding planets, while the anime takes place mainly in a village called "Pupu Village" (anime original) further inside Dream Land, which is somewhat limited. While the everyday scenes in Pupu Village are portrayed in a heartwarming and calm light, the story about the Star Warriors (Galaxy Soldier Army) is more serious. Due to the policy of not having humans (earthlings) in the show, most of the characters have comical one to three heads tall figures, with all but the main characters resembling the haniwa figures. The characters (mainly the monsters) from the games come from the original Kirby's Dream Land, Kirby's Adventure (and the port Nightmare in Dream Land), Kirby's Dream Land 2, Kirby's Dream Land 3, and Kirby Super Star, but none of the characters from Kirby 64: The Crystal Shards make an appearance. Due to differences in style and worldbuilding, many of the characters that were introduced from the original games had their personalities drastically changed. This is especially true of Kirby and King Dedede, who appear most often.

The first few episodes are mostly about battles with monsters and the secrets of the Star Warriors, but from episode 4 onwards, as Kirby spends his daily life in Pupu Village and grows in strength as a Star Warrior, we begin to see more and more stories that are essentially the aforementioned social satire and parodies that are not directly related to the show's main plot of confronting Nightmare. The anime's Dream Land has convenience stores, cars, and TV sets, which bring it closer to the real world. Also, depending on the episode, various problems, such as famine, global warming, ozone depletion, environmental issues, illegal dumping, education concerns, falsified information on TV shows, lack of tourist morale, abandoned pets going feral, restructuring, government focusing on the construction of public buildings and the Japanese Paleolithic hoax, are set up in Dream Land to capitalize on the social satire elements.

The anime features parodies and homages that cover a wide range of genres, including such famous films as Psycho, Roman Holiday, Modern Times, Ikiru, Jurassic Park, Gone with the Wind, Mothra, and King Kong, as well as literary works such as Don Quixote, Nineteen Eighty-Four, and Harry Potter and the Philosopher's Stone.

Furthermore, in addition with the social satire, the series is also characterized by a great deal of metafictional elements. Episode 49 deals with the harshness of the anime production scene and the degradation of the drawings' quality, while episode 89 satirizes the decline of cel animation due to the development of 3DCG technology and the moe anime and otaku, which were not well known to the public at the time.

4Kids adaptation

The anime was licensed by 4Kids Productions and dubbed into English for North America under the title Kirby: Right Back at Ya!. On the official English website, there was also a manga based on the actual anime, reminiscent of American comics at the time. In the adaptation process, the show was heavily edited: content that was deemed inappropriate for American and Canadian audiences, such as the scenes in episode 2 where King Dedede fires the cannon on an armored vehicle and Kirby works in the village pub and prison, ended up cut out completely. There are also several other deleted or shortened scenes, such as the scene where Tuff and his friends throw fireworks at Escargoon's parade in episode 13, the scene where the facility catches fire in episode 29 and 46, the scene where King Dedede burns a book in episode 38, the scene where Kirby and King Dedede are squeezed in episode 61, and the scene where Customer Service screams in the final episode. The Galaxy Soldier Army subplot was removed entirely, and all soldiers are referred to as Star Warriors. The final episodes (episodes 96 to 100 in Japan) were not aired on TV, but were released on DVD only in the form of Kirby: Fright to the Finish!!.

Some of the signs and writings, even those originally in English, were removed. The design of the armored car that King Dedede rode in episodes 1 to 34 had a military camouflage color scheme in Japan, but the American version has an orange and yellow color scheme. Art works resembling Mona Lisa, Venus de Milo etc. in episode 77 have been changed so that it is difficult to associate them with them. A lot of dialogue has been changed, for example in episode 29, Monsieur Goan now speaks normally, and the equivalents of intense spiciness have been changed to "volcano," "pepperoni," "Mexico," etc. The sounds of non-verbal animals, such as the sheep on the village mayor's ranch, as in Pokémon, have also been dubbed. The sheep in the Japanese version make a "meh" sound, while in the American version they make a "baa" sound. Makiko Ohmoto's performance of Kirby is the only voice that was preserved in almost the entirety of the English dub, much like Ikue Ōtani's voicework as Pikachu.

The Japanese score was completely replaced by music produced locally and independently at 4Kids. In some cases, some songs from the shows that have previously aired on 4Kids TV, were reused in this show. Some of the sound effects have been replaced as well, for example in episode 60, the sound of Sirica's weapons (machine guns, bazookas, etc.) firing has been changed, and conversely, during the Sirica vs. Meta Knight one-on-one fight scene, there is an additional metallic sound when their swords clash with each other.

Some episodes were aired out of their original order, sometimes to put a holiday-themed episode closer to that holiday or to coincide with an event that was happening at the time. For example, "A Novel Approach", which parodied the Harry Potter books, was moved to air in conjunction with one of the real books' release. Sometimes episodes were aired earlier to advertise new Kirby games, one example took episodes 96 and 97, "Crisis of the Warp Star" from the finale of the series and aired them near the middle as the television special "Air Ride in Style" to advertise the Kirby Air Ride game for the Nintendo GameCube. Because these episodes were at a major climax in the show, certain scenes from the special were edited to make it look like Tiff and Kirby were having a "prophetic dream" rather than the events actually happening. The episodes were placed in the original order and sans these edits for the Kirby: Fright to the Finish!! DVD of the final episodes.

Michael Haigney originally stated in an interview that the Fox Network would not let it air the episode "A Dental Dilemma" because it shows dentists in a bad light and could scare children (although it was meant to encourage children to brush their teeth and go to a dentist if they thought they had a cavity). This applied to all other countries that used the 4Kids dub as well. The episode did eventually get dubbed, but it was aired under a third season, along with some other episodes in the line-up.

Broadcast history
The series ran for one hundred episodes on CBC and TBS from October 6, 2001, to September 27, 2003. After a preview on September 1, 2002, 4Kids aired the series on 4Kids TV (formerly known as FoxBox) from September 14, 2002, to late 2006. The North American version of the anime was dubbed by 4Kids Entertainment, and distributed by 20th Television (U.S.) and Nelvana Limited (international).

The series began rebroadcasting in Japan on June 28, 2007, on the Tokyo MX station, then on June 21, 2008, in the US, Saturday mornings at 11am EST on 4Kids TV, and ended along with all other 4Kids TV shows on December 27, 2008. On June 6, 2009, Kirby, along with Teenage Mutant Ninja Turtles: Fast Forward, rebroadcast in the US again, and aired at 7:30am EST on The CW4Kids. The series used to be seen on 4Kids's video on demand service and on www.4Kids.tv. However, the show was removed from the 4Kids TV website in October 2009 as 4Kids Entertainment only held the rights to the show till September 2009. A moderator on the 4Kids forums stated in November 2009 that 4Kids no longer holds the license. Since May 21, 2009, the Tokyo MX website has stated that the show has been removed from the air.

Since 2009, the series was available for streaming via the Wii no Ma channel for the Wii in Japan only, with each episode worth 100 Wii Points, but on April 30, 2012, Nintendo terminated broadcast of the Wii no Ma channel. On June 23, 2011, the show has made a comeback to Europe and Australian audiences on the Wii, for the first time as the Kirby TV Channel, which expired on December 15, 2011. This service also returns in April 2012, however, the same episodes will be available, rather than the other half. A special CG animated episode, titled  was released for the Wii no Ma service in Japan on August 9, 2009. A stereoscopic 3D version of the episode was dubbed by Nelvana and streamed internationally in two parts on the Nintendo 3DS' Nintendo Video service in January 2012, under the title "Kirby 3D". With the release of Kirby's Dream Collection for Kirby's 20th anniversary, three complete episodes are available to watch on the Wii via that disc.

Theme songs
Japanese
Openings

October 6, 2001 - February 22, 2003
Lyricists: Shinji Miyake & Jian Hong / Composer & Arranger: Akira Miyagawa / Singer: Xiang Qi
Episode Range: 1-71

March 1 - September 27, 2003
Lyricist: Shōko Fujibayashi / Composer: Kazuto Satō / Arrangers: Hiromi Suzuki & Yasumasa Satō / Singer: Hiroko Asakawa
Episode Range: 72-100

Endings

October 6, 2001 - February 22, 2003
Lyricist: Miwako Saitō / Composer: Akira Miyagawa / Arranger: Yō Shibano / Singer: Xiang Qi
Episode Range: 1-71

March 1 - September 27, 2003
Lyricist: Yuka Kondō / Composer & Arranger: Akira Miyagawa / Singer: Konishiki Yasokichi
Episode Range: 72-100

English
"Kirby Kirby Kirby!" (Also used in the North American version of Donkey Konga as "Kirby: Right Back At Ya!")
Composed by Ralph Schuckett, Manny Corallo, Wayne Sharpe, John VanTongeren, Louis Cortelezzi, Rusty Andrews, Peter Scaturro, Norman J. Grossfeld, Anne Pope, Liz Magro, John Sands, John Siegler, and Jonathan Lattif

Home video releases

North America
The series was released on DVD and VHS in the United States by 4Kids Entertainment Home Video and distributed by Funimation. The companies first released the series in three volumes on VHS and DVD (alongside a fourth volume that was cancelled), each containing three episodes:

In June 2005, 4Kids and Funimation released an edit of the last five episodes of the series combined into a movie, called Kirby: Fright to the Finish!!.

Also in 2005, 4Kids and Funimation released two DVDs as part of 4Kids' "DVDouble-Shot" series, which each contained two episodes. For Kirby, each DVD focused on a specific copy ability:

In 2008, 4Kids and Funimation released two seven-episode DVDs which altogether made up the first fourteen episodes of the series.

Other
On May 6, 2010, the first 26 episodes were released on DVD in complete season format in Taiwan.

Three episodes from the series were included in the 2012 video game compilation Kirby's Dream Collection.

The complete series will be released on Blu-ray Disc in Japan on March 14, 2023.

Reception
David Sanchez from GameZone found the show "awesome" and specifically praised Escargoon, whom he called "one of the best contributions to the Kirby franchise thanks to his dimwitted attitude and obvious stupidity" and suggested should be in the fourth Super Smash Bros. game. However, Common Sense Media described the English dub as "a stab at educational value, but really all about fighting monsters", Christina Carpenter from THEM Anime described the show as "more pandering kiddy fluff from the Fox Box". Bamboo Dong of Anime News Network cited Kirby: Right Back at Ya! as one of several examples of anime series that "exist only to be made fun of" and stated that "the series really isn't that good at all" and would only be enjoyed by loyal Kirby fans.

See also

F-Zero: GP Legend
Pokémon
Sonic X

References

External links

 Hoshi no Kirby official website (CBC)
 Hoshi no Kirby official website (Nintendo)
 Hoshi no Kirby official website (Tokyo MX)
 
 

2001 Japanese television series debuts
2001 anime television series debuts
2003 Japanese television series endings
Animated series based on Nintendo video games
Anime television series based on video games
Funimation
Japanese children's animated action television series
Japanese children's animated adventure television series
Japanese children's animated comedy television series
Japanese children's animated fantasy television series
Kirby (series)
TBS Television (Japan) original programming
Television about magic
Television series about shapeshifting
Television series based on Nintendo video games
Television series set on fictional planets

de:Kirby_(Spieleserie)#Kirby_in_Fernsehen_und_Film